The 1907 Isle of Man TT races were the inaugural International Tourist Trophy for motor-cycles held on the Isle of Man. The event was held on Tuesday 28 May 1907 over the St John's Short Course consisting of a Single Cylinder and a Twin-Cylinder class. The race was ten laps of the 15 mile 1,430 yards course, a total race distance of 158 miles 220 yards (226.071 km).

At 10am on the Tuesday 28 May 1907, 25 riders started in pairs in a time-trial format for the road-legal touring motorcycles with exhaust silencers, saddles, pedals and mud-guards. On lap 1, Jack Marshall riding a Triumph suffered a fall and Frank Applebee Junior a puncture to his 5 hp Rex machine. By lap 2, Stanley Webb riding a 5 hp Triumph had to stop at St. Johns to adjust a drive-belt and retired on lap 3 with an engine exhaust-valve problem. At the compulsory 10‑minute replenishment stop, Oliver Godfrey had to retire when his 5 hp Rex motorcycle caught fire.

The Single Cylinder class race was won by Charles R. Collier riding a Matchless in 4 hours, 8 minutes and 8 seconds at an average race speed of 38.21 mph. His brother Harry Collier, also riding a Matchless, had problems with an engine seizure on lap 2 and eventually retired on lap 9.

The Twin-Cylinder class and overall race was initially led by Rem Fowler riding a Norton. On lap 1, Fowler completed the course in 23 minutes and 19 seconds, in second place was Billy Wells in a time of 23 minutes and 21 seconds and Charlie Collier in the single-cylinder class with a time of 23 minutes and 45 seconds. The overall lead fell away as Fowler suffered a number of problems with drive-belts and spark-plugs, and on lap 7 crashed at nearly 60 mph due to a burst tyre at the "Devils Elbow" on the Kirk Michael to Peel section of the course. Fowler nearly gave up, but was told by a spectator that he led the twin-cylinder class by 30 minutes from Billy Wells and went on to win at an average race speed of 36.22 mph and set the fastest lap of the race at 42.91 mph.

1907 International Auto-Cycle Tourist Trophy
Tuesday 28 May 1907 – 10 laps (158 miles 220 yards) St. John's Short Course.

Sources

External links
 Detailed race results
 Mountain Course map 

1907 in motorsport
1907
Isle
Isle of Man TT